Swissmint is the official mint of the Swiss Confederation. Located in the Swiss capital city Bern, it is responsible for manufacturing Swiss franc coins, both of the currency and bullion variety. Apart from making coins for the government, Swissmint also manufactures medals and commemorative coins for private customers.

Status
Swissmint is an agency of the Swiss federal government. It is part of the Federal Finance Administration, which in turn belongs to the Federal Department of Finance. Since 1998, the Official Mint of the Confederation operates as an independent business unit under the name Swissmint. As of 2005, Swissmint has 21 employees.

Building
The mint's building is a heritage site of national significance. It was built in 1903–06 based on designs by Theodor Gohl to replace an older building at the Gerberngraben. The sober, industrial-style yellow brick building is fronted by a Neo-Renaissance façade in marble and sandstone.

Notes and references

See also 
 Swiss National Bank, the independent institution responsible for Swiss banknotes and monetary policy.

External links 

 Official website
  Federal Finance Administration website on Swissmint

Mints (currency)
Cultural property of national significance in the canton of Bern
Federal Department of Finance
Buildings and structures in Bern